Kinloch  is a small settlement along the A94 road in the Coupar Angus and Meigle ward of the council area of Perth and Kinross in eastern Scotland.

The most prominent building is Kinloch House, designed and built by the radical MP George Kinloch in 1798, replacing an older house on the same site.  From around 1972, until his death in 1989, Kinloch House was the residence of Captain The 6th Earl of Enniskillen, M.B.E., an Anglo-Irish aristocrat. Popularly known as David Enniskillen, he had been born into a famous Ulster family and had spent much of his life in Kenya.

See also
Meigle Sculptured Stone Museum
The Earl of Enniskillen
Florence Court

References

Villages in Perth and Kinross